The 2012–13 Monterrey season was the 66th professional season of Mexico's top-flight football league. The season is split into two tournaments—the Torneo Apertura and the Torneo Clausura—each with identical formats and each contested by the same eighteen teams. Monterrey began their season on July 21, 2012 against América, Monterrey play their homes games on Saturdays at 7:00pm local time. Monterrey reached the quarter-finals of the Final phase in the Apertura tournament and reached the semi-finals in the Clausura tournament. Monterrey won their third straight CONCACAF Champions League after defeating Santos Laguna 4–2 on aggregate and qualified to the 2013 FIFA Club World Cup. Monterrey ended up in third place at the 2012 FIFA Club World Cup after defeating Al Ahly of Egypt in the third place match.

Torneo Apertura

Squad

Regular season

League table

Results

Final phase

Tijuana advanced 2–1 on aggregate

Goalscorers

Regular season

Source:

Final phase

Results

Results summary

Results by round

Torneo Clausura

Squad

Regular season

League table

Results

Final phase

Monterrey advanced 2–1 on aggregate

América advanced 4–3 on aggregate

Goalscorers

Regular season

Source:

Final phase

Results

Results summary

Results by round

CONCACAF Champions League

Group stage

Championship Round

Quarterfinals

Semifinals

Final

FIFA Club World Cup

References

Mexican football clubs 2012–13 season
2013